William Thayer Tutt (March 2, 1912 in Coronado, California – February 24, 1989 at El Paso) was an executive for several ice hockey leagues and organizations. He is the son of Charles L. Tutt, Jr., and has two brothers, Charles L. Tutt, III and Russel Thayer Tutt, and one sister. William married Margaret Bradford Timmons (February 13, 1909 – June 2, 1988 at Colorado Springs) on November 4, 1932.  Later he married former figure skating champion Yvonne Sherman.

Tutt was instrumental in bringing the first NCAA men's ice hockey championships to the Broadmoor World Arena in Colorado Springs, Colorado. He also helped bring the Soviet Union's ice hockey team to the United States for the first time in 1959. From 1966 to 1969, he was president of the International Ice Hockey Federation.

In the 1970s, when word got out that the United States Olympic Committee was looking for a newer, more modern home, he helped convince the committee to move to Colorado Springs.

Also in the 1970s, Tutt was instrumental in bringing the United States Figure Skating Association headquarters to Colorado Springs as he arranged the purchase and transfer of the land for the new building. He also helped to bring the World Figure Skating Championships to the Broadmoor.

Tutt was elected to the United States Hockey Hall of Fame in 1973, to the Hockey Hall of Fame in 1978, and to the United States Figure Skating Hall of Fame in 1991.

References

External links

1912 births
1989 deaths
Hockey Hall of Fame inductees
Ice hockey people from Colorado
International Ice Hockey Federation executives
IIHF Hall of Fame inductees
Lester Patrick Trophy recipients
Sportspeople from Colorado Springs, Colorado
United States Hockey Hall of Fame inductees
USA Hockey personnel